The Instituto Universitario del Centro de México (University Institute of Central Mexico) (EDUCEM in Mexico; UCEM in León, Guanajuato) is a private Mexican university-preparatory based in León, Guanajuato.

It was founded in 2001 starting with 2 campuses in the city of León, Guanajuato and with which it would expand in 2003 throughout Guanajuato in 2004 and later it would expand in other states of Mexico, it offers different fields of study and has 128 campuses in 18 states of Mexico has 33,000 students around Mexico.

References

External links 

 

University-preparatory schools
Private universities and colleges in Mexico
Educational institutions established in 2001
2001 establishments in Mexico